Massigui is a town and commune in the Cercle of Dioila in the Koulikoro Region of southern Mali. As of 1998 the commune had a population of 45,120.

See also 
 List of cities in Mali

References

Communes of Koulikoro Region